Temnothorax parvulus is a species of ant belonging to the family Formicidae.

References

Myrmicinae